JW-Jones (born July 15, 1980) is a Canadian blues guitarist, singer, songwriter and band leader. He is a Juno Award nominee (2015), Billboard magazine Top 10 Selling artist, and winner of the International Blues Challenge for "Best Self-Produced CD Award" for his release 'High Temperature' in 2017 and Best Guitarist in 2020.

Jones' first recording contract was signed with CrossCut Records (Germany) in 2000, who released his first seven CDs in Europe. He was the first artist signed to the NorthernBlues Music label in Toronto and released his first six recordings with the label. Jones has also worked with Ruf Records in the USA, and Blind Pig Records. He has released nine studio albums and one live album. He has played in 23 countries on four continents and continues to tour extensively. Jones, who lives in Ottawa, Ontario, has performed at blues festivals, theatres and clubs in Canada, the USA, Europe, United Kingdom, Russia, Australia and Brazil.

On June 19, 2014, Jones was presented with a Forty Under 40 Award by Ottawa Business Journal/Ottawa Chamber of Commerce. It is a celebration of entrepreneurship in Ottawa - a "salute to the region’s young business stars who balance business achievement, professional expertise and community involvement."

Critical response
In May 2009, Jones' song "Parasomnia" appeared on a Guitar World featured CD, Guitar Masters Vol. 2, among  B.B. King, Jimmy Page, Jeff Beck and Carlos Santana. The Canadian national newspaper The Globe and Mail referred to Jones as "one of this country's top blues guitar stars". The US Blues Revue magazine' stated that "Jones' style is a fluid amalgam of T-Bone Walker's big, bright chords, Johnny "Guitar" Watson's slashing leads, and Clarence "Gatemouth" Brown's jazzy sting". Billboard called Jones part of "a new wave of young talent moving onto Canada’s blues stage."

Charlie Musselwhite stated, "JW Jones is one of the best guitar players I’ve heard in a long time. He and his band do great tunes with cool arrangements and I love listening to them. They play with taste and fire at the same time." The guitarist Little Charlie Baty has said, "JW is one of the young guns in the blues guitar world who consistently delivers the goods on record and on stage - and of course I'm gonna dig anybody who writes a tune called 'Batyology'!" (an instrumental that Jones wrote in homage to Baty). The Canadian-born Hollywood actor Dan Aykroyd, who is also known for his Blues Brothers persona "Elwood Blues" has called the group an "amazing blues band".

Chuck Leavell, a member of the Rolling Stones, wrote "His evolution as a musician and vocalist shine through on this record like never before. Real songs, real playing by real people, and JW is the real deal" in the liner notes for the JW-Jones release 'High Temperature'.

Career

1990s
Jones started as a drummer and was invited to sit in with Mississippi blues artist Big Jack Johnson, New Orleans artist Jumpin' Johnny Sansone, and Ottawa musician Tony D. among others.

As a guitarist and singer, Jones, who attended Ridgemont High School in Ottawa, Ontario, won the 1998 R&R Concerts "Battle of the Bands", at the age of eighteen. The prize package included studio time that was used to record a six song demo that was later reviewed by Blues Revue. The next year, Jones won the 1999 Ottawa Blues Guitar Riff-Off competition. The prize package included studio time that was used to record his first album, Defibrillatin (SBR001-2000 / NBM0001-2001). The album included Steve Marriner, a then-high-school-age Ottawa blues harp player. AllMusic states that the "Keyboardist [Pierre] Chretien [on organ and piano] is credited with bringing a jazz influence to Jones' and the band's sound" during that time period. The CD liner notes say that Steve Hiscox played drums on the album and Nathan Morris played upright bass. Morris played on several subsequent albums and played and toured with the band. On subsequent albums, Morris is also credited for electric bass.

2000-2009
In the 2000s, Jones was invited to perform on stage with a number of blues bands and artists, including The Fabulous Thunderbirds, Junior Watson, Little Charlie & the Nightcats, Rusty Zinn, Rick Holmstrom, Rod Piazza & The Mighty Flyers, Anson Funderburgh & The Rockets, The Mannish Boys and Hubert Sumlin. Jones' second album was Bogart's Bounce, which included performances by the singer and blues "harp" player Kim Wilson (from The Fabulous Thunderbirds) and the pianist Gene Taylor (from The Blasters).

His third album with his band, My Kind of Evil (2004), was produced by the multi-Grammy nominee Kim Wilson (singer for The Fabulous Thunderbirds), and includes vocals by the Canadian singer/guitarist Colin James on two tracks, and Roxanne Potvin on another. Songs from the album have been played on the internationally syndicated House of Blues Radio Hour. The music reviewer Brad Wheeler from Canada's The Globe and Mail newspaper praised the "graceful ability he (Jones) shows on guitar" in the album. Wheeler wrote, "...the Ottawa player makes retro moves, layering swinging blues with keyboards and very noticeable horns that never dominate the fine-lined fills and lead work."  The Allmusic review of My Kind of Evil, by Chris Nickson, says,t "He's very good on covers, such as "I Don't Know," but his own songs — the vast majority of this disc — have plenty of life."

In 2006, Jones released his fourth album, Kissing in 29 Days, which included performances by David "Fathead" Newman on tenor saxophone. Newman was the main saxophone player with Ray Charles for 12 years. In Blues Revue magazine, Bret Kofford wrote, "JW-Jones is highly regarded in blues circles."

On May 13, 2008, the fifth album, Bluelisted went on sale. The recording includes special guests Little Charlie Baty (leader of the band Little Charlie & the Nightcats, which records on Alligator Records), Junior Watson, Richard Innes and Larry Taylor. The liner notes are written by Dan Aykroyd.

On May 6, 2009, Hubert Sumlin (then 77), a blues guitarist who worked with Howlin' Wolf for more than 20 years and was named in the 100 Greatest Guitarists of all time by Rolling Stone magazine, recorded with JW-Jones at Sun Studios in Memphis, Tennessee. The rhythm section was Richard Innes and Larry Taylor (who appear on Bluelisted).

2010-2019
Midnight Memphis Sun (NorthernBlues/CrossCut/Ruf) was released on August 10, 2010. In April 2011, Jones signed an endorsement deal with Gibson Guitars. Jones' seventh album, Seventh Hour, released on March 27, 2012, reached #1 on B.B. King's Bluesville on XM Sirius Satellite Radio, and led the band to performing at Buddy Guy's Legends in Chicago in February 2013, and opening for B.B. King at the RBC Ottawa Bluesfest on July 14, 2013.

Jones was asked to co-host the Maple Blues Awards in Toronto on January 20, 2014, which took place mid-way through a tour with Johnny Winter. Jones opened for Jimmie Vaughan in May that year.

On June 19, 2014, Jones was presented with a Forty Under 40 Award by Ottawa Business Journal/Ottawa Chamber of Commerce. It is the biggest and best celebration of entrepreneurship in Ottawa, a salute to the region’s young business stars who balance business achievement, professional expertise and community involvement.

"Belmont Boulevard" was released on October 14 and is Jones's first release for the American blues label Blind Pig Records, recorded in Nashville with the Grammy Award winning producer Tom Hambridge. It debuted at #9 on Billboard'''s Blues Charts on November 8, 2014. The disc was released in Canada on October 7, distributed by Stony Plain Records. It debuted and held the #1 position on Roots Music Report, the radio air-play chart, in Canada for thirteen weeks between October 2014 and February 2015. The album was nominated as Blues Album of the Year at the Juno Awards and Recording of the Year at Maple Blues Awards, and Jones was nominated for Guitarist of the Year.

After Buddy Guy sang with JW-Jones at Buddy Guy's Legends in Chicago, Illinois, on April 14, 2015, he asked Jones to play guitar with him during two sold-out shows at Centrepointe Theatre in Ottawa on April 27 and 28, 2015. Guy joined the band for the fourth time in seven months, at his club on November 15, 2015.

On July 17, 2015, Canned Heat invited Jones to perform during their set at Ottawa Bluesfest in Ottawa, and on September 12, 2015, invited Jones to perform during their set at Southside Shuffle Jazz & Blues Festival in Mississauga, Ontario,

In Mar/Apr 2016, Jones performed in England, Scotland, and Wales, on his first UK Tour.

On September 6, Guy sang with JW-Jones at Buddy Guy's Legends, the fifth time they have performed together on stage. Later that month, Jones performed two shows in Argentina, the 23rd country in which he has performed.

Jones' ninth record, High Temperature, produced in Nashville by Colin Linden with liner notes written by Chuck Leavell, a touring musician with The Rolling Stones, was released on October 28, 2016.

In November, JW-Jones' ninth release, High Temperature was named the "Hot Shot Debut" landing at No. 8 on the Billboard Top 10. On February 4, 2017, High Temperature won "Best Self-Produced CD Award" in Memphis at the International Blues Challenge, representing the Ottawa Blues Society.  It was selected as a top 5 finalist a month earlier out of over 90 entries from worldwide blues societies.

Chad Smith, drummer of the Red Hot Chili Peppers made a guest appearance with Jones at Blues On Whyte in Edmonton, Alberta, on May 27, 2017.  The appearance led to radio interviews with Edmonton's Sonic 1029 and The Ryan Jespersen Show (Global News - 630 CHED)

On November 12, 2017, Buddy Guy sang with JW-Jones at Buddy Guy's Legends, and told him "I love the way you play, man" during the appearance.  This was the sixth time they have performed together on stage.

'High Temperature' was nominated for Recording/Producer of the Year at Maple Blues Awards with Colin Linden, and Jones' longtime bassist, Laura Greenberg was nominated for Bass Player of the Year.

Jones released his tenth album, and first live album, entitled LIVE on September 28, 2018.

2020-present
JW-Jones competed with HOROJO Trio representing the Ottawa Blues Society at the International Blues Challenge, an annual event by the Blues Foundation in Memphis, Tennessee where the band took first place in the band category. Jones also won 'Best Guitarist" honours.

On August 14, 2020, Jones released his 11th album "Sonic Departures" which was partially recorded during COVID-19 lockdown and features a 13 piece horn section. The album debuted at number 4 on the Billboard Blues charts and is nominated for Recording/Producer of the Year at the Maple Blues Awards happening in February 2021.

On February 1, 2021, Jones won Best Jazz/Blues Artist at the Ottawa Awards.

In February 2022, Jones won Best Jazz/Blues Artist at the Ottawa Awards for the second year in a row.

On August 15, 2022, Jimmie Vaughan recorded with Jones, produced by Gordie Johnson (Big Sugar) in Austin, Texas.

Acting and modelling
Jones has appeared in various acting roles on television; Bar Rescue'' (Spike TV) - season 3, episode 20, and commercials; Vinci tablet, Metropolitan Restaurant (Ottawa, Canada). He has done modelling for Indochino Suits and the high-tech company, Unify.

Awards and nominations

Discography

Solo releases

References

External links
JW-Jones official website

1980 births
Living people
Canadian blues guitarists
Canadian male guitarists
Musicians from Ottawa
Canadian blues singers
Canadian songwriters
Writers from Ottawa
21st-century Canadian guitarists
21st-century Canadian male singers
Northern Blues Music artists
Blind Pig Records artists